Pistol Harvest is a 1951 Western film starring Tim Holt.

Plot
In the Old West, two abandoned sibling children, Johnny and Felice, search for help in a western desert. Cattle rancher Terry Moran rescues Felice along with a gold piece engraved with her name.  Moran raises Felice to adulthood. Fifteen years later, Felice has fallen in love with Tim, one of Moran's cowhands. Tim's sidekick, Chito Rafferty, interrupts a picnic between Tim and Felice to report an attempted cattle theft. Tim and Chito find two men, Jack and Andy, whom Chito identifies as the thieves. The thieves apologize claiming they are hungry and need money.  Tim gives them some money, but Chito remains suspicious. At the local bank, Tim and Chito pick up $30,000 in cash for Moran as payment for cattle Moran sold. Banker, Elias Norton, plans to steal the money. He hires Jack and Andy (whom he also hired to steal the cattle) to ambush Tim and Chito. The ambush is unsuccessful and the two henchmen go back to a saloon in town, after reporting their failure to Norton.

Norton asks Moran to loan him the $30,000. Moran refuses, intending to purchase land for Felice. Norton kills Moran, witnessed by Norton's bank employee, Pouty. Tim, Felice and Chito discover Moran's body and Tim suspects Jack and Andy of murder. Tim and Chito see Jack and Andy and give chase. Jack is caught, but Andy gets away. Jack denies the murder, but is not believed. Jack is held captive at the Moran ranch while Chito summons the sheriff. Andy frees Jack; the two engage Tim in a gunfight; and Jack is wounded. As Chito and the sheriff pursue Jack and Andy, Felice concludes Jack is her brother, Johnny, after she and Tim find a gold coin with Johnny's name engraved.

Andy leaves Jack to find a doctor. Tim finds Chito, who split from the sheriff, and they locate and subdue Jack. Tim reunites Jack with Felice. Jack eventually admits he and Andy were connected to Norton. Norton sets fire to his warehouse to destroy evidence of his criminal activity, and he and Pouty leave town on Norton's wagon. Tim and Chito arrive at the warehouse in time to extinguish the fire where they find Andy's body. Tim and Chito pursue Norton. Pouty jumps off the wagon, Norton runs out of bullets, and both are subdued. Tim picks up Jack at the ranch and they leave to attend Norton's trial. Chito catches up with them after joking with Felice about his romantic tendencies.

Cast
 Tim Holt as Tim 
 Richard Martin as Chito Rafferty
 Joan Dixon as Felice Moran
 Edward Hearn as Terry Moran
 Mauritz Hugo as Elias Norton
 Harper Carter as Johnny (child)
 Robert Clarke as Jack/Johnny (adult)
 Robert J. Wilke as Andy
 William Griffith as Pouty
 Joan Freeman as Felice (child)

Production
Robert Clarke was announced as co star.

References

External links

1951 films
1951 Western (genre) films
American Western (genre) films
Films directed by Lesley Selander
RKO Pictures films
American black-and-white films
1950s English-language films
1950s American films